Schwaförden is a municipality in the district of Diepholz, in Lower Saxony, Germany. It is situated approximately 40 km south of Bremen.

Schwaförden is also the seat of the Samtgemeinde ("collective municipality") Schwaförden.

References

Diepholz (district)